Bromobimane or monobromobimane is a heterocyclic compound and bimane dye that is used as a reagent in biochemistry. While bromobimane itself is essentially nonfluorescent, it alkylates thiol groups, displacing the bromine and adding the fluorescent tag (λemission = 478 nm) to the thiol. Its alkylating properties are comparable to iodoacetamide.

Synthesis
Bromobimane is prepared from 3,4-dimethyl-2-pyrazolin-5-one (a condensation product of ethyl 2-methylacetoacetate with hydrazine) by chlorination followed by basic treatment; with aqueous K2CO3 under heterogeneous conditions, the required syn-bimane, 2,3,5,6-tetramethyl-1H,7H-pyrazolo[1,2-a]pyrazole-1,7-dione, is the major product. It can then be selectively brominated to the target bromobimane (with 1 equivalent of Br2; or dibromobimane, if 2 equivalents of Br2 are used):

Bromobimanes are light-sensitive compounds and should be kept refrigerated and protected from light.

References

Alkylating agents
Organobromides
Lactams
Hydrazides